Naza Automotive Manufacturing Sdn Bhd (NAM) is a Malaysian automobile manufacturer. It is headquartered in Gurun, Kedah. The company was established in 2002 and by 2003, the construction of Naza Group of Companies own manufacturing plant commenced. The manufacturing plant was built on a  parcel of land comprises an assembly plant, two-storey office, a test track, lots for vendors and suppliers, staff accommodation and recreation facilities.

The plant assembles the Peugeot 208 GTi for the Malaysian market.

History and Milestone
 September 2002: Ground Breaking Ceremony in Gurun, Kedah
 April 2003: Construction NAM Plant in Gurun begins
 May 2004: NAM commences operations in Gurun, Kedah
 August 2004: Start of production for the Naza Ria
 December 2004: Start of production for the Naza Citra
 May 2005: NAM is certified ISO 9001:200
 November 2005: Start of production for the Kia Spectra
 May 2006: Launch of the Naza 206 Bestari
 July 2008: Launch of the Peugeot 407
 September 2008: Start of production for the Kia Pregio
 January 2009: Launch of the Peugeot 308
 October 2009: Launch of the Kia Picanto
 November 2009: Launch of the Kia Forte
 November 2009: NAM is certified ISO 14001
 November 2010: Launch of the Peugeot 207
 March 2011: Launch of the Forte 6-Speed
 September 2011: Production of 150,000th vehicle
 February 2018 : Gurun plant sold to PSA Group

Production
Naza Auto Manufacturing (NAM) currently assembles Kia, Peugeot and Citroën vehicles for the Malaysian market. The plant had previously assembled Naza-badged models from Hafei, Kia and Peugeot.

Hafei

Kia

Past models

Peugeot

Past models

Current models

Citroën / DS

Past models

See also 
Naza Group - Parent company
Nasim (NSB) - Peugeot distributor

References

External links
 Official Website
 Naza Kia Official Website
 Peugeot Malaysia Official Website

Manufacturing companies established in 2002
2002 establishments in Malaysia
Car manufacturers of Malaysia
Privately held companies of Malaysia
Kuala Muda District